Sporobolus jacquemontii, commonly known as American rat's tail grass, is a species of grass native to the southeastern United States, Central and South America. It has become a weed in Queensland in Australia.

Taxonomy
The Latin specific epithet jacquemontii refers to the French botanist and geologist Victor Jacquemont (1844–1912).

References

jacquemontii
Grasses of the United States
Drought-tolerant plants